Loka Kerala Sabha (World Kerala Assembly) is an event hosted by the state government of Kerala to bring Malayali diaspora living around the globe under one platform. It was hosted under the department of Non-Keralite Residents. It aims at utilizing the expertise of NRKs for developing Kerala state. Loka Kerala Sabha is proposed to happen once in two years.

2018 event
The first Loka Kerala Sabha happened from 12–13 January 2018. The delegates were invited by a committee constituted by the government that nominated representatives living outside Kerala. 351 members attended the first Loka Kerala Sabha, out of which 100 were living abroad, 42 were from other states of India, 30 experts from various fields and 6 members representing non-resident Keralite returnees and peoples' representatives. The event was inaugurated by the Chief Minister of Kerala, Pinarayi Vijayan.

References

Events in India
Biennial events
History of Kerala (1947–present)